The Brocklebank Baronetcy, of Greenlands in the parish of Irton in the County of Cumberland and Springwood in the County Palatine of Lancaster, is a title in the Baronetage of the United Kingdom. It was created on 22 July 1885 for Thomas Brocklebank. He was a deputy lieutenant, high sheriff and justice of the peace for Cumberland. Born Thomas Fisher, he had assumed by Royal licence the surname of Brocklebank (which was that of his maternal grandfather) in lieu of Fisher in 1845. The Brocklebank family business was T&J Brocklebank Ltd, a shipping company formed early in the 19th century by the sons of Daniel Brocklebank. In 1911, a large shareholding in the company was sold to Edward Bates and Son, and a further acquisition then gave Cunard a controlling interest in Brocklebanks in 1912.   The third Baronet was a director of the Cunard Steamship Company of the Suez Canal Company and of the Great Western Railway. His eldest son, the fourth Baronet, died unmarried and was succeeded by his younger brother, the fifth Baronet. He was chairman of Cunard Ltd and Cunard White Star Ltd between 1959 and 1965. As of 2007 the title is held by his son, Sir Aubrey Brocklebank, the sixth Baronet, who succeeded in 1974.  He is the honorary treasurer of the Standing Council of the Baronetage.

Brocklebank baronets, of Greenlands and Springwood (1885)
Sir Thomas Brocklebank, 1st Baronet (1814–1906); his third son Harold Brocklebank built Grizedale Hall in 1905
Sir Thomas Brocklebank, 2nd Baronet (1848–1911)
Sir Aubrey Brocklebank, 3rd Baronet (1873–1929)
Sir Thomas Aubrey Lawies Brocklebank, 4th Baronet (1899–1953)
Sir John Montague Brocklebank, 5th Baronet (1915–1974)
Sir Aubrey Thomas Brocklebank, 6th Baronet (born 1952)
Sir Aubrey has two surviving sons: Aubrey William Thomas Brocklebank (born 1980), and Hamish John Brocklebank (born 1987).   A third son Archie Thomas Brocklebank (born 19 August 1999) died 28 April 2019.

References

Brocklebank